The gens Mucia was an ancient and noble patrician house at ancient Rome. The gens is first mentioned at the earliest period of the Republic, but in later times the family was known primarily by its plebeian branches.

Origin
The first of the Mucii to appear in history is Gaius Mucius Scaevola, a young man at the inception of the Roman Republic. According to legend, he volunteered to infiltrate the camp of Lars Porsena, the king of Clusium, who besieged Rome  BC, and who may in fact have captured and held the city for some time. Mucius, armed with a dagger, attempted to assassinate Porsena, but unfamiliar with Etruscan dress, he mistook the king's secretary for the king, and was captured.

Brought before the king, Mucius declared that he was but one of three hundred Roman men who had sworn to carry out this mission, or die in the attempt.  As a show of bravery, it was said that he thrust his right hand into a brazier, and stood silently as it burned.  Porsena was so impressed by his courage and endurance that Mucius was freed, and some traditions held that Porsena withdrew his army in fear of the threat of assassination invented by the young Roman.

Praenomina
The chief praenomina used by the Mucii were Publius, Quintus, and Gaius, all of which were very common throughout Roman history.

Branches and cognomina
The only major family of the Mucii bore the cognomen Scaevola.  This surname is said to have been acquired by Gaius Mucius, who lost the use of his right hand following his attempt on the life of Lars Porsena, and was subsequently called Scaevola because only his left hand remained.  The similar cognomen, Scaeva, which occurs in other gentes, including among the Junii, is generally assumed to mean "left handed", and Scaevola could be a diminutive form; but in ordinary usage, scaevola referred to an amulet.

The only other important cognomen of the Mucii was Cordus, borne by some of the Scaevolae.  According to some traditions, Gaius Mucius was originally surnamed Cordus, and assumed the surname Scaevola on account of his deed before Porsena.  However, it may be that the tradition concerning his right hand was a later addition to the story, intended to explain the descent of the Mucii Scaevolae from one of the heroes of the Republic.  Although Gaius Mucius was a patrician, the later Mucii Scaevolae were plebeians.

Members

 Gaius Mucius Scaevola, attempted the life of Lars Porsena,  BC.
 Publius Mucius Scaevola, tribune of the plebs in 486 BC, supposedly burned nine of his colleagues for conspiring with the consul Spurius Cassius Vecellinus.
 Publius Mucius Scaevola, father of the praetor of 215 BC.
 Quintus Mucius P. f. Scaevola, praetor in 215 BC, received Sardinia as his province.  His command there was prolonged for three years.  He may have been consul in 220.
 Publius Mucius Q. f. P. n. Scaevola, praetor in 179 BC, and consul in 175, triumphed over the Ligures.
 Quintus Mucius Q. f. P. n. Scaevola, praetor in 179 BC, and consul in 174.
 Publius Mucius (P. f. Q. n.) Scaevola, consul in 133 BC; two years later he succeeded his brother, Publius Licinius Crassus Dives Mucianus, as Pontifex Maximus.  He was regarded as one of the founders of the jus civile.
 Publius Licinius Crassus Dives Mucianus, Pontifex Maximus, and consul in 131 BC; he was defeated and killed by Aristonicus.
 Quintus Mucius Q. f. Q. n. Scaevola, called the augur, consul in 117 BC.
 Mucia Q. f. Q. n., the elder daughter of Quintus Mucius Scaevola, the augur, married Lucius Licinius Crassus, the orator, who was consul in 95 BC, and the colleague of Mucia's cousin, Quintus Mucius Scaevola.
 Tertia Mucia Q. f. Q. n., better known as Mucia Tertia, the younger daughter of the augur, married Gnaeus Pompeius, the triumvir.
 Quintus Mucius P. f. (P. n.) Scaevola, consul in 95 BC and Pontifex Maximus, was murdered at the temple of Vesta by order of the younger Marius.
 Gaius Mucius Scaevola, one of the quindecimviri sacris faciundis in 17 BC.
 Gaius Licinius Mucianus, consul in AD 52, 70, and 75; a general, statesman, orator, and historian praised by Tacitus, he was a strong supporter of Vespasian.

See also
 List of Roman gentes

Footnotes

References

Citations

Bibliography

 Marcus Terentius Varro, De Lingua Latina (On the Latin Language).
 Marcus Tullius Cicero, Brutus, De Domo Sua, De Finibus Bonorum et Malorum, De Legibus, De Officiis, De Oratore, Epistulae ad Atticum, Epistulae ad Familiares, Laelius de Amicitia, Philippicae, Pro Balbo, Pro Plancio, Pro Sexto Roscio Amerino, Topica.
 Titus Livius (Livy), History of Rome.
 Marcus Velleius Paterculus, Compendium of Roman History.
 Valerius Maximus, Factorum ac Dictorum Memorabilium (Memorable Facts and Sayings).
 Marcus Annaeus Lucanus (Lucan), Pharsalia.
 Quintus Asconius Pedianus, Commentarius in Oratio Ciceronis Pro Scauro (Commentary on Cicero's Oration Pro Scauro).
 Gaius Plinius Secundus (Pliny the Elder), Naturalis Historia (Natural History).
 Marcus Fabius Quintilianus (Quintilian), Institutio Oratoria (Institutes of Oratory).
 Flavius Josephus, Bellum Judaïcum (The Jewish War).</ref>
 Publius Cornelius Tacitus, Historiae.
 Plutarchus, Lives of the Noble Greeks and Romans.
 Gaius Suetonius Tranquillus, De Vita Caesarum (Lives of the Caesars, or The Twelve Caesars).
 Lucius Annaeus Florus, Epitome de T. Livio Bellorum Omnium Annorum DCC (Epitome of Livy: All the Wars of Seven Hundred Years).
 Appianus Alexandrinus (Appian), Bellum Civile (The Civil War).
 Aulus Gellius, Noctes Atticae (Attic Nights).
 Lucius Cassius Dio Cocceianus (Cassius Dio), Roman History.
 Eusebius Sophronius Hieronymus (St. Jerome), Adversus Jovinianum (Against Jovinianus).
 Digesta seu Pandectae (The Digest).
 Joannes Zonaras, Epitome Historiarum (Epitome of History).
 Gerardus Vossius, De Historicis Latinis (The Latin Historians), Jan Maire, Brittenburg (1627).
 Sigmund Wilhelm Zimmern, Geschichte des Römischen Privatrechts bis Justinian (History of Roman Private Law to Justinian), J. C. B. Mohr, Heidelberg (1826).
 Barthold Georg Niebuhr, The History of Rome, Julius Charles Hare and Connop Thirlwall, trans., John Smith, Cambridge (1828).
 Wilhelm Drumann, Geschichte Roms in seinem Übergang von der republikanischen zur monarchischen Verfassung, oder: Pompeius, Caesar, Cicero und ihre Zeitgenossen, Königsberg (1834–1844).
 Anton Westermann, Geschichte der Beredtsamkeit in Greichenland und Rom (History of Rhetoric in Greece and Rome), Johann Ambrosius Barth, Leipzig (1835).
 Dictionary of Greek and Roman Biography and Mythology, William Smith, ed., Little, Brown and Company, Boston (1849).
 Paul von Rohden, Elimar Klebs, & Hermann Dessau, Prosopographia Imperii Romani (The Prosopography of the Roman Empire, abbreviated PIR), Berlin (1898).
 T. Robert S. Broughton, The Magistrates of the Roman Republic, American Philological Association (1952).
 John C. Traupman, The New College Latin & English Dictionary, Bantam Books, New York (1995).

 
Roman gentes